Melanolestes is a Nearctic and Neotropical genus of assassin bugs (Reduviidae). Nine species are known :

Species
 Melanolestes argentinus Berg, 1879
 Melanolestes degener (Walker, 1873)
 Melanolestes goiasensis Coscarón & Carpintero, 1993
 Melanolestes lugens Coscarón & Carpintero, 1993
 Melanolestes minutus Coscarón & Carpintero, 1993
 Melanolestes morio (Erichson, 1848)
 Melanolestes picicornis (Stål, 1860)
 Melanolestes picinus Stål, 1872
 Melanolestes picipes (Herrich-Schaeffer, 1846)

References 

Reduviidae